Chempittapally is an old masjid in West Kochi in Kerala State, India. The name "Chempittapally" is derived from the Malayalam word "chemp" (means copper) and "palli" (means masjid). The roof of this famous masjid was decorated with copper tiles, hence chempitta pally. The compound has 3 gates; one in west which opens way to Panayapilly, second in south which opens way to Goldenmukku and Kochangadi, and the main gate in the eastern side of compound, which opens way to Angadi, which in turn leads the way to Jew Street and Mattancherry Bazaar towards the north and to Chullickal towards south.

References 

Mosques in Kerala
Religious buildings and structures in Ernakulam district